Plethodidae is an extinct family of teleost fish that existed during the Late Cretaceous period. Fossils are known from North America, North Africa, and Europe.

Description
Plethodids possessed thin, angelfish-like bodies and often had high dorsal fins which made them distinctive from other types of fish. Their skeletons were partially cartilaginous, though the amount varied from one species to another.

Genera
As of 2005, there are seventeen recognized genera in the family Plethodidae:
 Bachea
 Bananogmius
 Dixonanogmius
 Enischnorhynchus
 Luxilites
 Martinichthys
 Moorevillia
 Niobrara
 Paranogmius
 Pentanogmius
 Plethodus
 Pseudonogmius
 Pseudothryptodus
 Syntegmodus
 Thryptodus
 Tselfatia
 Zanclites

References

Tselfatiiformes
Prehistoric ray-finned fish families
Cretaceous bony fish
Late Cretaceous first appearances
Late Cretaceous extinctions